The National Computer Center for Higher Education (CINES), based in Montpellier, is a public institution of French administrative character placed under the supervision of the Ministry of Research and Innovation (MESRI), and created by decree issued in 1999. CINES offers IT services used for public research in France. It is one of the major national centers for computing power supply for research in France.

CINES has three missions:
 High performance computation on supercomputers;
 The permanent archiving of electronic documents;
 The hosting of national computer equipment.

History
The National University Center for Computation (CNUSC) in Montpellier was established in 1981, responsible for hosting scientific apps for the research community, as well as applications in the field of librarianship. At the end of December 1999, the CNUSC was transformed into the current CINES, created by Decree N. 99-318 of 20 April 1999. The change brought new missions and a change of status. On the sixth march of 2014, the status of CINES was further amended by decree, published in the official journal. This decree provides a new mission which is the hosting of computer equipment on a national level. During this period, the number of employees within the institution stood around forty technicians and engineers.

Calculating mission
The CINES has been providing computing resources to the French research community for so long, and its machine fleet is evolving regularly. As a result, it cooperates with the National Large Intensive Computing Equipment (GENCI). The Occigen supercomputer is ranked 70th in the world in the TOP 500 calculators in June 2018. The Occigen machine (BullX), with a peak power of 3.5 petaflops, consists of a total of 3,366 nodes and 85,824 calculation cores divided into 2,106 dual-socket nodes equipped with Intel Xeon E5-2690V3 Haswell processors (12 cores), 1,260 dual-socket nodes equipped with Intel Xeon E5-2690V4 Broadwell processors (14 cores), Infiniband FDR 4x (56 GBits), and 5 Po of disks (Luster).

Old computing machines
In January 2011, CINES had several machines for high performance computing:
 an SGI Altix ICE 8200 EX7 machine;
 an IBM P1600 + Cluster POWER5 machine;
 a Bull cluster (with GPU for hybrid computing).
 The supercomputer Jade CINES: The Jade supercomputer (SGI Altix ICE 8200 EX) with a power of 267 Tflops 
 1,536 dual-socket nodes equipped with Intel Xeon E5472 processors with 32 GB of RAM 
 1,344 dual-socket nodes equipped with Intel Nehalem X5560 processors with 36 GB of RAM  
 Infiniband DDR and QDR 4x dual plane
 700 TB of disks (Luster) 
 The IBM machine with a power of 1.85 + 0.6 TFlops
 9 Power4 nodes with 32/64 GB of RAM
 switch Federation 
 4TB of Disks (GPFS)
 5 nodes P575 to 32 GB
 Infiniband

The Jade supercomputer was ranked 27th in the world of TOP 500 calculators in November 2010, it was the sixth European machine and the first French machine for public research.

Top500 ranking
Every six months, the world TOP500 supercomputer ranking is held. the table below shows the best places won by the various Cines systems.

Permanent archiving mission
Archiving digital data is a key factor in the success of any digitization and information-sharing policy. The second national strategic mission assigned to CINES is the development and implementation of a powerful solution for long-term preservation of the digital heritage. In addition to exceptional resources and equipment in the field of supercomputing, CINES has access to one of the largest French production platforms dedicated to archiving digital data. The documents that are candidates for long-term archiving in PAC are scientific data from observations, measurements, simulations or calculations; heritage data such as the theses defended in France, pedagogical data, publications (articles published in particular on the HAL platform) or collections of digitized scientific journals; and administrative data from universities.

To respond to some issues raised in the context of sustainable digital archiving, which are inevitable risks for which procedures must be put in place to mitigate their impact on the day they occur, CINES relies on the use of national and international standards as well as a quality approach using proactive management risks and an approach for the certification of the service.

CINES also has an expertise cell on data formats and has a large computer and archival experience that allows it to be one of the leaders in sustainable digital archiving in Europe.

Hosting computer equipment mission
The new mission of CINES is to provide support for the research community that needs space to help important computing environments operate. The goal is to provide organizations lacking material
space in the machine room with the possibility of increasing their capacity in the number of racks. It is often difficult to store multiple racks with all the dependent components (energy, air conditioning, 24/24 maintenance). CINES can bring this technical environment because its environment is adapted to accommodate computing in "industrial quantity".

See also
 Supercomputing in Europe
 Research and Technology Computing Center (France)

External links
 CINES homepage

Supercomputer sites
Computer science institutes in France
1999 establishments in France